Cherukad Govinda Pisharodi (26 August 1914 – 28 October 1976), commonly known as Cherukad, was a Malayalam-language playwright, novelist, poet and political activist, associated with the Communist movement in Kerala state, India.

Biography 
Cherukad was born in Chemmalasseri in Perinthalmanna taluk to Kizheettil Pisharath Karunakara Pisharody and Cherukad Pisharath Narayani Pisharasiar. He got elementary training in Sanskrit from Guru Gopalanezhuthachan. After completing high school education, he joined as a teacher in Chemmala Aided Mappila School. He passed Vidvan Examination from Madras and worked in many schools as teacher before joining Pattambi Sanskrit College as Lecturer.

In 1936, Cherukad married Kizheettil Pisharath Lakshmi Pisharasiar. Their son K. P. Mohanan is a noted writer.

Cherukad's politically charged writing was influential in defining the Malayalam literature of the fifties and sixties. His political life was connected with the lives of the leading politicians and patriots of Kerala. Cherukad was one of the founding members of the Deshabhimani Study Circle, a progressive literary movement in Kerala and the predecessor of the Purogamana Kala Sahitya Sangham.  Some of his important works are Jeevithappatha, Tharavaditham, Manushyabandhangal, Namal Onnu, Manushya Hridayangal, Janmabhumi, Devalokam, Manninte Maril (On the Bosom of the Soil), Muthassi and Sanidasa. His autobiography Jeevithappatha (1974) received the Kerala Sahitya Akademi Award in 1975 and Kendra Sahitya Akademi Award in 1977.

Cherukad died on 28 October 1976. The Cherukad Award is an annual literary award given in his memory.

Bibliography

Novel
 Manninte Maaril (Calicut: Prabhatham, 1954)
 Muthassi (Calicut: Kairali Sahakarana Sangham, 1959) Read online
 Sanidasa (Calicut: P. K. Brothers, 1959) Read online
 Pramani (Trichur: Current, 1962)
 Marumakal (Cochin: CICC, 1963)
 Muthassi: Part II (Trichur: Current, 1964)
 Devalokam (Trichur: Current, 1971)
 Bhooprabhu (Trivandrum: Sakthi, 1976)
 Maranapathram (Trivandrum: Chintha, 1977)

Play
 Snehabandhangal (Quilon: Prabhatham, 1954, 2nd edition)
 Tharavaditham (Trichur: Mangalodayam, 1954)
 Swathanthra (Calicut: P. K. Brothers, 1955)
 Manushyahridayangal (Trichur: Current, 1955)
 Rakteswari (Calicut: P. K. Brothers, 1956)
 Visuddha Nuna (Trichur: Current, 1956)
 Odukkathe Onam (Calicut: P. K. Brothers, 1956)
 Janmabhumi (Calicut: P. K. Brothers, 1958)
 Mulankoottam (Trichur: Current, 1958)
 Anakkettu (Calicut: P. K. Brothers, 1958)
 Kutti Thampuran  (Trichur: Current, 1958)
 Kutti Thampuratti  (Calicut: P. K. Brothers)
 Vaalnakshatram (Calicut: P. K. Brothers, 1960)
 Chittu Vilakku (Trichur: Current, 1960)
 Kodumkaattu (Palghat: Udaya, 1966)
 Nammalonnu (Trichur: Current, 1969, Revised edition)
 Adima (Calicut: P. K. Brothers, 1969, 2nd edition)
 Doctor Kachan (Palghat: Udaya, 1970)

Poetry
 Aradhana (Palghat: Vellinezhi, 1945)
 Thiramala (Palghat: Vellinezhi, 1945)
 Anthappuram (Trichur: Mangalodayam, 1945)
 Methaapp (Trichur: Mangalodayam, 1954)
 Manushyane Maanikkuka (Calicut: P. K. Brothers, 1961)

Short story
 Jeevikkan (Calicut: P. M. Mohammed, 1954)
 Mudra Motiram (Calicut: Prabhatham, 1954)
 Cherukadinte Cherukathakal  (Trichur: Current, 1954)
 Theruvinte Kutti (Calicut: P. K. Brothers, 1956)
 Chekkuthante Koodu (Trichur: Current, 1958)
 Chuttan Moori (Calicut: P. K. Brothers, 1962)

Children's literature
 Karuppan Kutty (Trivandrum: Balan, 1962, 2nd edition)
 Oru Divasam (Trichur: Current, 1960)
 Thanthra Kurukkan (Trichur: Kerala Sahitya Akademi, 1968)

Autobiography
 Jeevithappatha (Pattambi: Sakthi, 1974)

Miscellaneous
 Menonte Meni (Ottappalam: published by the author, 1945) (Ottan Thullal)
 Society President (Calicut: Deshabhimani, 1946) (Ottan Thullal)
 Vella Chantha (Calicut: Marxist Books, 1952) (Ottan Thullal)
 Onam Varunnu (Cochin: Prabhatham, 1955) (Onam songs)

References

External links
 Article by C Radhakrishnan
 Public Relations Department, Government of Kerala. Retrieved 11 April 2011. 
 Deshabhimani Weekly special issue on the birth centenary of Cherukad

1914 births
1976 deaths
Indian Marxist writers
Indian male short story writers
Indian political writers
Indian male dramatists and playwrights
Indian Marxists
Poets from Kerala
Malayalam-language writers
Malayalam-language dramatists and playwrights
Malayalam novelists
Malayalam short story writers
Malayalam poets
Recipients of the Sahitya Akademi Award in Malayalam
20th-century Indian novelists
20th-century Indian poets
20th-century Indian dramatists and playwrights
20th-century Indian short story writers
People from Malappuram district
Dramatists and playwrights from Kerala
Novelists from Kerala
Recipients of the Kerala Sahitya Akademi Award